Jules Joseph Witcover (born July 16, 1927) is an American journalist, author, and columnist.

Biography
Witcover is a veteran newspaperman of 50 years' standing, having written for The Baltimore Sun, the now-defunct Washington Star, the Los Angeles Times, and The Washington Post. Together with Jack Germond, Witcover co-wrote "Politics Today," a five-day-a-week syndicated column, for over 24 years.

Witcover was born in Union City, New Jersey. Witcover began working in Washington for Newhouse Newspapers in 1954. He was reportedly steps away from where Robert F. Kennedy was shot in 1968. He was also one of the reporters featured in the 1972 book on campaign journalism, The Boys on the Bus, and eventually came to be seen as a "journalistic institution," according to media critic Howard Kurtz.

As of 2018, Witcover writes three columns a week, distributed by Tribune Content Agency. His most recent book is The American Vice Presidency: From Irrelevance to Power. Published in 2014, Kirkus Reviews described the work as a “valuable book of American history.”  Other work includes Very Strange Bedfellows: The Short and Unhappy Marriage of Nixon & Agnew, Public Affairs (2007), and Joe Biden: A Life of Trial and Redemption. In March 2008, his history of campaign finance reform, "The Longest Campaign," appeared on the Center for Public Integrity's The Buying of the President 2008 website. Joe Biden: A Life Of Trial And Redemptions 2020 update includes 4 additional chapters, picking up where the original version left off and covers Biden's successful presidential campaign.

Witcover married author and H.L. Mencken scholar Marion Elizabeth Rodgers on June 21, 1997. He is a graduate of Columbia College (1949) and Columbia University Graduate School of Journalism (1951).

Books written with Germond 
 
Blue Smoke & Mirrors: How Reagan Won and Why Carter Lost the Election of 1980, Viking Press (1981)
Wake Us When It's Over: Presidential Politics of 1984, Macmillan (1985)
Whose Broad Stripes and Bright Stars? The Trivial Pursuit of the Presidency 1988, Warner Books (1989)
Mad As Hell: Revolt at the Ballot Box 1992, Warner Books (1992)

Books written solo 
 
The American Vice Presidency: From Irrelevance to Power, Smithsonian Books (2014)
Joe Biden: A Life of Trial and Redemption, William Morrow & Company (2010, paperback 2019, updated 2020)
Very Strange Bedfellows: The Short and Unhappy Marriage of Nixon & Agnew, Public Affairs (2007)
The Making of an Ink-Stained Wretch: Half a Century Pounding the Political Beat, Johns Hopkins Press (2005)
Party of the People: A History of the Democrats, Random House (2003)
No Way to Pick a President: How Money and Hired Guns Have Debased American Elections, Farrar, Straus and Giroux (1999)
The Year the Dream Died: Revisiting 1968 in America, Warner Books (1997)
Crapshoot: Rolling the Dice on the Vice Presidency, Crown Publishers (1992)
The Main Chance: A Novel, Viking Press (1979)
Marathon: The Pursuit of the Presidency 1972-1976, Viking Press (1977)
White Knight: The Rise of Spiro Agnew, Random House (1972)
The Resurrection of Richard Nixon, Putnam (1970)
85 Days: The Last Campaign of Robert Kennedy, Putnam (1969) (A 20th-anniversary edition was printed by Quill in 1988 with a new introduction by Sen. Edward M. Kennedy and epilogue by the author)

References

External links

1927 births
Living people
The Washington Post people
The Baltimore Sun people
American male journalists
American columnists
Columbia College (New York) alumni
Columbia University Graduate School of Journalism alumni